Karel Blažej Kopřiva (or Karl Blasius Kopriva; 9 February 1756 in Cítoliby – 15 May 1785 in Cítoliby) was a Czech organist and composer from a family of musicians.

Life and career
Kopřiva studied first with his father, the composer Václav Jan Kopřiva (1708–1789), and later with Josef Seger in Prague. Then he became organist at the St. Jacob's Church in Cítoliby. He is especially renowned for his numerous concertos and fairs.

His brother Jan Jáchym Kopřiva (1754–1792) was also a notable musician.

List of selected works
 12 symphonies (lost)
 8 organ concertos (one survived)
 Missa Solemnis in Dis
 Requiem in C
 Motetti: Dictamina mea (in Dis), Gloria Deo (in D), Veni sponsa Christi (in D)
 Offertorium O, magna coeli Domina (in C)
 Arias: Ah, cordi trito (in Dis), Amoenitate vocum (in D), Quod pia voce cano (in Dis), Siste ultricem dexteram (in B)

Solo organ works (complete)
 Prelude in C major
 Fugue-pastorella in C major
 Fugue in A flat major
 Fugue in F minor
 Fughetta after Handel in G major
 Fuga supra cognomen DEBEFE in D minor
 Fugue in A minor

Sources
 Karel Blažej Kopřiva biography 
 Another biography

External links
 

1756 births
1785 deaths
Czech Classical-period composers
Czech male classical composers
Czech classical organists
Male classical organists
People from Louny District
18th-century classical composers
18th-century male musicians
18th-century keyboardists